Just the Hits may refer to:

 Just the Hits (compilation series), a series of compilation albums released in New Zealand from 1999 to 2001
 Just Hits (1987 album) compilation album by Bette Midler